"Vibe" is a song by South Korean singer Taeyang, featuring Jimin of BTS. Released through The Black Label on January 13, 2023, it is Taeyang's first release in over five years since White Night (2017). The song was written by Taeyang and Vince and composed by Teddy, Kush, Vince, Taeyang, Jimin and 24. The song charted in over fifteen countries and reached 76 in Billboard hot 100.

Background and composition
Rumors about the single first began circulating at the end of 2022, when media outlets reported that Big Bang member Taeyang would be releasing a solo album in January 2023, with one of the songs likely to feature BTS member Jimin. On January 4, 2023, the release of the collaboration was officially announced through social media. This marked Taeyang's first release under YG Entertainment's subsidiary The Black Label, which he transferred to a week earlier.

Accolades

Credits and personnel
Credits adapted from Melon.
 Teddy – composer, producer
 Taeyang – lyricist, composer
 Vince – lyricist, composer
 Kush – composer, arranger
 Jimin – composer
 24 – composer, arranger
 Bang Young-joo – recording
 Yoon Dong-gun – recording
 Pdogg – recording
 Josh Gudwin – mixing
 Chris Gehringer – mastering

Charts

Weekly charts

Monthly charts

Release history

References

2023 singles
2023 songs
Taeyang songs